Afelimomab (MAK 195F) is an anti-TNFα monoclonal antibody. Administration of afelimomab reduces the concentration of interleukin-6 in patients with sepsis, but reduces mortality only marginally.

References 

Immunosuppressants